False buckthorn is a common name for several plants and may refer to:

Frangula, a genus containing species formerly classified with the "true" buckthorns of the genus Rhamnus
Sideroxylon lanuginosum, a species unrelated to the "true" buckthorns, native to the Southwestern United States